Baliqchi is a district of Andijan Region in Uzbekistan. The capital lies at Baliqchi.

Subdivisions
The district includes three urban-type settlements (Baliqchi, Xoʻjaobod and Chinobod) and nine rural communities (for 60 villages):

 Baliqchi
 Olimbek
 Boʻston
 Guliston
 Oxunboboyev
 Siza
 Xoʻjaobod
 Eski Xaqqulobod
 Oʻrmonbek

References

Districts of Uzbekistan
Andijan Region
Populated places established in 1926
1926 establishments in Uzbekistan